Mount Union Area Senior High School  is a public high school, located in Mount Union Borough, Pennsylvania, that educates students in grades  in the Mount Union Area School District.

History

Vocational opportunities
Students in grades 10–12 at Huntingdon Area High School have the opportunity to attend the Huntingdon County Career and Technology Center, located in Mill Creek, Pennsylvania.

References

External links
  Mount Union Area Senior High School 
 School Performance Profile: Mount Union Area Senior High School

Buildings and structures in Huntingdon County, Pennsylvania
Schools in Huntingdon County, Pennsylvania